Sevilla FC is a Spanish professional football club based in Sevilla, Andalusia, who play their matches in Estadio Ramón Sánchez Pizjuán. The club was formed 25 January 1890.

The club has won La Liga once and the Segunda División four times. They have won the Copa del Rey five times and the Supercopa de España once. Sevilla are the record winners of the UEFA Cup/UEFA Europa League, with six titles won between 2006 and 2020. They also won the 2006 UEFA Super Cup.

This list details the club's achievements in major competitions, and the top scorers for each season. Top scorers in bold were also the top scorers in the Spanish league that season. Records of local or regional competitions are not included due to them being considered of less importance.

Key

Key to league record:
 Pld – Matches played
 W – Matches won
 D – Matches drawn
 L – Matches lost
 GF – Goals for
 GA – Goals against
 Pts – Points
 Pos. – Final position

Key to rounds:
 Prel. – Preliminary round
 QR1 – First qualifying round
 QR2 – Second qualifying round, etc.
 PO – Play-off round
 Inter – Intermediate round (between qualifying rounds and rounds proper)
 GS – Group stage
 1R – First round
 2R – Second round, etc.
 QF – Quarter-finals
 SF – Semi-finals
 F – Final
 W – Winners
 DNE – Did not enter

Seasons
Prior to 1929 Spain did not have a national football league. Sevilla competed in the championship of the Southern region, called Campeonato Sur, the winners of which qualified for the Copa del Rey along with the other regional champions. Sevilla became the champions of this league seventeen times and were runners-up three times. Because there is not much information from this era, the list of seasons starts at the beginning of La Liga in the 1928–29 season.

References

 
Seasons
Sevilla
Association football lists by Spanish club